The Eastern Victorian alpine bushfires were a series of bushfires in 2003 that burnt in the Alpine National Park and Mount Buffalo National Park in north-eastern Victoria, Australia. The bushfire started with eighty-seven fires that were started by lightning in the north east of Victoria on 8 January 2003. Eight of these fires were unable to be contained and joined to form the largest fire in Victoria since the 1939 "Black Friday" bushfires.

Thousands of kilometres of fencing was also destroyed. This was the longest running fire until the 2006-07 Great Divide fires.

In early February, at the peak of the fires, around 3,760 people were involved in the fire effort, excluding local Country Fire Authority brigades. This figure includes 160 Australian Defence Force staff, over 300 interstate firefighters, 33 alpine firefighting specialists from New Zealand and 35 personnel from the United States. In total, 15,725 personnel were directly engaged on fighting these bushfires.

The areas affected included, Mount Buffalo, Mount Bogong, Mount Feathertop, Bright, Dinner Plain, Benambra, Omeo, Cobungra, Shannonvale, Bundara, Anglers Rest, Sunnyside, Glen Wills, and Dargo.

See also
 2003 Canberra bushfires
 2002-03 Australian bushfire season
 Bushfires in Victoria

References

Eastern Victorian alpine bushfires
Eastern Victorian alpine bushfires
2000s in Victoria (Australia)
2003
Alpine National Park